Jindallae-hwachae is a variety of hwachae, or Korean traditional fruit punch, made with Korean rhododendron petals and mung bean starch. It is prepared for Samjinnal (삼짇날, a Korean traditional holiday which falls on every March 3 in the lunar calendar).

See also 
 Hwajeon
 Hwachae
 List of Korean beverages
 Korean tea

References

External links
Hwachae: Refreshing Beverage to Beat the Summer Heat
Photo

Hwachae
Non-alcoholic drinks
Flower dishes